Cevallos is a Spanish surname and variant spelling of Ceballos. Notable people with the name include:

Alejo Peralta y Díaz Cevallos, founder of the Mexico City Tigers baseball club
Alex Cevallos, Ecuadorian football goalkeeper, brother of José Francisco
Diego Fernández de Cevallos, Mexican politician
F. Javier Cevallos, Ecuadorian American scholar, president of Framingham State University
Francisco Fernández de Cevallos, Mexican politician
Francisco José Borja Cevallos, Ecuadorian diplomat
Gabriel Cevallos García, Ecuadorian writer and scholar
Jorge Cevallos, Mexican racing driver
José Cevallos Cepeda, Mexican politician and military leader
José Francisco Cevallos, Ecuadorian football goalkeeper, brother of Alex
José Cevallos Enríquez, Ecuadorian footballer, son of José Sr.
Luis MacGregor Cevallos, Mexican architect and writer
Pedro Cevallos, Spanish politician
Pedro Antonio de Cevallos, Spanish military, former Governor of Buenos Aires
Pedro José Cevallos, former President of Ecuador
Rodrigo Borja Cevallos, former President of Ecuador

See also
Ceballos, surname

Spanish-language surnames